Gouvernøren Harbor is a small harbor indenting the east side of Enterprise Island just west of Pythia Island in Wilhelmina Bay, off the west coast of Graham Land, Antarctica. The name was applied by whalers using the harbor because the whaling vessel Gouvernøren I was wrecked there in 1916.

References

 

Ports and harbours of Graham Land
Danco Coast